Paraferdina is a genus of echinoderms belonging to the family Goniasteridae.

The species of this genus are found in Indian Ocean.

Species:

Paraferdina laccadivensis 
Paraferdina plakos 
Paraferdina sohariae

References

Goniasteridae
Asteroidea genera